Martin Ludwig (April 8, 1867 – February 15, 1931) was an American gymnast. He competed in three events at the 1904 Summer Olympics.

References

1867 births
1931 deaths
American male artistic gymnasts
Olympic gymnasts of the United States
Gymnasts at the 1904 Summer Olympics
Place of birth missing